The 1964 Critérium du Dauphiné Libéré was the 18th edition of the cycle race and was held from 29 May to 6 June 1964. The race started in Avignon and finished in Grenoble. The race was won by Valentín Uriona of the Kas team.

General classification

References

1964
1964 in French sport
1964 Super Prestige Pernod
May 1964 sports events in Europe
June 1964 sports events in Europe